Nikke Ström (born 8 June 1951) is a Swedish rock musician, mostly known as the bass player in Nationalteatern.

Ström was born and raised in Karlskoga, where he played in different bands. In the beginning of 1970 he studied philosophy at Stockholm University. He had become politically active in the leftist movement against the Vietnam War, and he was chairman of the FNL group in his hometown Karlskoga.

Nikke Ström moved to Gothenburg in 1971 and played in different leftist progg bands, including Nynningen. He participated in the Tent Project (Tältprojektet), a musical theater performance on the history of the Swedish working class, which toured the country the summer of 1977, and the same year he joined Nationalteatern as bass player in the "rock orchestra".

References

External links

1951 births
Living people
Swedish male musicians
Stockholm University alumni
People from Karlskoga Municipality